Otvice is a municipality and village in Chomutov District in the Ústí nad Labem Region of the Czech Republic. It has about 700 inhabitants.

References

Villages in Chomutov District